Seppa West is one of the 60 constituencies of Legislative Assembly of Arunachal Pradesh. Name of current MLA (August-2016) of this constituency is Mama Natung. It is located in West Kameng district.

Members of the Legislative Assembly

Election results

2019

See also
List of constituencies of Arunachal Pradesh Legislative Assembly
Arunachal Pradesh Legislative Assembly
Tani Loffa

References

External links

West Kameng district
Assembly constituencies of Arunachal Pradesh